Scopula canularia  is a moth of the  family Geometridae. It is found on Cuba and Puerto Rico.

References

Moths described in 1870
canularia
Moths of the Caribbean